Kelly Rodrigues Santana Costa (born 22 June 1987), simply known as Kelly, is a Brazilian footballer who plays as a central defender or a midfielder for Santos.

Club career
Born in São Paulo, Kelly began her career with hometown side Juventus-SP, before joining Santos in 2006. In January 2012, after the club's women's football section was closed, she moved to Centro Olímpico.

Kelly returned to Peixe in April 2015, after a short period at Ferroviária. She left in 2019, and was announced at Flamengo in January 2020.

In 2021, Kelly moved abroad and joined the Israeli side Hapoel Be'er Sheva. She returned to her home country with EC São Bernardo in the following year, before rejoining Santos on 27 January 2023.

Honours
Santos
Campeonato Paulista de Futebol Feminino: 2007, 2010, 2011, 2018
Copa do Brasil de Futebol Feminino: 2008, 2009
Copa Libertadores Femenina: 2009, 2010
Campeonato Brasileiro de Futebol Feminino Série A1: 2017

References

External links

1987 births
Living people
Footballers from São Paulo
Brazilian women's footballers
Women's association football defenders
Women's association football midfielders
Santos FC (women) players
Associação Desportiva Centro Olímpico players
Associação Ferroviária de Esportes (women) players
Clube de Regatas do Flamengo (women) players
Hapoel Be'er Sheva F.C. (women) players
Brazilian expatriate women's footballers
Brazilian expatriate sportspeople in Israel
Expatriate women's footballers in Israel